Sofia Nicole Hahn (born November 13, 2002) is an American actress and former child actress. She is known for her role as Emily Cooper in Adventures in Babysitting, among other television roles.

Life and career
Hahn began her career as a child model at the age of 3, and began working commercially at the age of 4.

Soon after, she began guest-starring in television shows. In 2009, Hahn appeared in CSI: Miami as Maggie Rush, a little girl whose mother was trying to regain custody of her, and in NCIS: Los Angeles as Elly Johnson, a young girl whose uncle was a suspect in a murder investigation. In 2010, Hahn had a small roles in iCarly and Criminal Minds. She also was seen in The Closer as Cody Tatem, a girl whose mother, a drug addict, possibly committed suicide.

In 2011, Hahn was seen as Tom Hanks' daughter, Sophie, a young pageant girl that appears on the show, Toddlers & Tiaras, in a comedy skit for Jimmy Kimmel Live!, as well as another comedy skit playing Topher Grace's childhood friend in a Pie Face commercial. In the summer of 2011, Hahn played Maria Valseca opposite Teri Polo and Esai Morales in the Lifetime movie, We Have Your Husband, which is based on the book, We Have Your Husband: One Woman's Terrifying Story of a Kidnapping in Mexico, by Jayne Garcia Valseca and Mark Ebner. Hahn also appeared in The Secret Life of Dorks as James Belushi's daughter, her first role in a feature film.

In January 2012, Hahn guest-starred in Disney's Jessie as Lindsay, and in the Wizards of Waverly Place television movie, The Wizards Return: Alex vs. Alex, as Bianca, Alex Russo's (Selena Gomez) Italian relative and young wizard in training. Hahn appeared in two Hallmark films: Matchmaker Santa, alongside Lacey Chabert; and Second Chances, with Alison Sweeney and Benjamin Stockham. During this year, Hahn appeared in a commercial for State Farm Insurance with Green Bay Packers quarterback Aaron Rodgers. She also guest-starred as Jenny Reynolds, a mysterious little girl who is abandoned at the Briarcliff Asylum, in American Horror Story: Asylum. Hahn also appeared in the fourth season of ABC Family's Pretty Little Liars, and the first season of ABC Family's The Fosters as young Callie Jacob (Maia Mitchell).

In 2016, Hahn co-starred as Emily in the Disney Channel original movie, Adventures In Babysitting, alongside Sabrina Carpenter and Sofia Carson. She also appeared in the horror film, The Remains.

More recently, Hanh had a recurring role in the second season of American Housewife.

Filmography

Film

Television

Notes

References

External links 

2002 births
Living people
21st-century American actresses
American child actresses
American film actresses
American television actresses
American actresses of Mexican descent
Actresses from San Antonio
Hispanic and Latino American actresses
American child models